Paraphlebia is a genus of flatwings in the damselfly family Thaumatoneuridae. It was formerly in the subfamily Argiolestinae of the family Megapodagrionidae, but was moved to the family Thaumatoneuridae as a result of molecular phylogenetic studies by Dijkstra et al. in 2013.

The Zoe Waterfall Damsel is the largest and most brightly colored of its species. It has two pair of similar-shaped vertical wings.

Species
These fifteen species belong to the genus Paraphlebia:
 Paraphlebia akan
Paraphlebia chaak
Paraphlebia chiarae
Paraphlebia duodecima Calvert, 1901
Paraphlebia esperanza
Paraphlebia flinti
Paraphlebia hunnal
 Paraphlebia hyalina Brauer, 1871
Paraphlebia itzamna
Paraphlebia ixchel
Paraphlebia kauil
Paraphlebia kinich
Paraphlebia kukulkan
 Paraphlebia quinta Calvert, 1901
 Paraphlebia zoe Selys in Hagen, 1861 - Zoe Waterfall Damsel

References

Calopterygoidea
Zygoptera genera
Taxa named by Edmond de Sélys Longchamps
Taxonomy articles created by Polbot